"Kitsunegari" is the eighth episode of the fifth season of American science fiction television series The X-Files. It was written by Vince Gilligan and Tim Minear, and directed by Daniel Sackheim. It aired in the United States on January 4, 1998 on the Fox network. "Kitsunegari" earned a Nielsen household rating of 11.6, being watched by 19.75 million people in its initial broadcast. The episode received mixed reviews from television critics.

The X-Files centers on FBI Special Agents Fox Mulder (David Duchovny) and Dana Scully (Gillian Anderson) who work on cases linked to the paranormal, called X-Files. Mulder is a believer in the paranormal, while the skeptical Scully has been assigned to debunk his work.

In this episode, Mulder and Scully search for the infamous killer Robert "Pusher" Modell (Robert Wisden)—a human with the ability to force his will onto others—after he escapes from prison. The agents soon discover that he is not their only concern; he has a sister, and she is just as capable of mind-control as he is.

"Kitsunegari" serves as a sequel to the third-season episode "Pusher". The episode's title means "Fox hunt" in Japanese. Minear's original story for the episode was one where a convicted criminal who happened to be an atheist would have heard the voice of God, commanding him to kill a truly evil man. Series creator Frank Spotnitz suggested that Minear should use fan favorite Robert Modell.

Plot 
In Lorton, Virginia, Robert Patrick Modell escapes from a prison hospital, after which the guard on duty dazedly says, "He had to go." Later, Walter Skinner (Mitch Pileggi), Dana Scully (Gillian Anderson), and Fox Mulder (David Duchovny) arrive at the prison and learn that Modell had suddenly woken up from his coma, caused when Mulder shot him, six months previously.

Scully worriedly asks Mulder if he's deliberately playing Modell's game again by heading the investigation. The agents learn from Modell's physical therapist that the Little Sisters of Charity, who try to visit all the hospitalized inmates, have been seeing Modell. Modell calls the prison and talks to Mulder, who refuses to listen. The call is traced to a sports shop in Occoquan, Virginia where a Carbo-Bar wrapper is left on the counter. Later, Modell is holding a picture of a young woman in a house where a man is covered in Cerulean Blue paint.

The agents identify the dead man as Nathan Bowman, who was the prosecutor at Modell's trial. "Kitsunegari", the Japanese term for "fox hunt", is written on the walls in blue paint. A paint smudge leads the agents to Nathan's wife Linda, a realtor who has an appointment with a "Mr. Fox Mulder" at a commercial property. Modell uses his influence to affect the first two officers to arrive, but he is not found. When she arrives, Linda tells the agents that her husband had talked about Modell. Mulder is confused, as Modell's actions do not fit his previous modus operandi. He investigates a nearby building, where he runs into Modell. Modell tries to get Mulder to listen to him, and eventually breaks Mulder's resolve.

Mulder later tells Scully that he does not believe Modell is on another killing spree and, after an odd interview with Linda, believes she is the killer and has the same powers as Modell. Skinner suspends Mulder, but Mulder vows to prove his theory right. He talks with Modell's therapist again, who mentions that a nun from the Little Sisters of Charity had called him a "conquered warrior". On a hunch, Mulder tries to show her a picture of Linda. The phone rings and, after stating she is with Mulder, she sticks her hand into a fuse box and is fatally electrocuted.

At the FBI safe house, a police car arrives with Modell. Modell enters the room that Linda is in and locks the door behind him. Mulder tells Scully the news of the therapist's death and urges her to keep Linda away from a phone. At the safe house, Skinner finds the door of Linda's room locked. He kicks the door down to find Modell and Linda, with Modell calmly saying that he has a gun. Without hesitation, Skinner shoots Modell when he sees a gun in Modell's hand, but, once he is on the ground, Skinner sees that his hand is curled into the shape of the gun.

As Modell is taken away on a stretcher, Mulder arrives and thinks that Modell forced Skinner to shoot him on purpose to protect Linda Bowman. Scully says that Linda has been taken home, at which an annoyed Mulder leaves to see Modell in the hospital. A nurse enters the hospital room and tells Mulder that she has to change the patient's bandages. When Mulder leaves, it is revealed that the nurse is actually Linda Bowman wearing a paper with "Nurse" written on it. Linda then talks Modell's heart into stopping. A nurse runs past Mulder, and he follows her into Modell's room, where Modell is pronounced dead. Mulder notices the "Nurse" paper has "214 Channel Avenue" on the back. That night, Mulder visits the address and finds Scully pointing a gun at him and claiming to be controlled by Linda; she kills herself. Mulder hears footsteps behind him and turns around to see Linda Bowman pointing a gun at him; "Linda" states personal information about Mulder, revealing herself to indeed be Scully despite what Mulder sees. She fires a shot at a figure moving behind Mulder, and he then sees Scully in front of him and the wounded Linda behind him. In Skinner's office, Linda Bowman's brain scan shows an advanced temporal lobe tumor, just like her fraternal twin, Robert Modell; the two had been separated at birth. Mulder has misgivings about nearly killing Scully and feels that he ultimately lost Linda's game.

Production
The episode was written by Tim Minear and  Vince Gilligan, and directed by Daniel Sackheim. Minear's original idea for the episode involved a convicted criminal who happened to be an atheist. While in prison, he would have heard the "voice of God" commanding him to kill a truly evil man. The prisoner would have then escaped, with only Mulder believing that he was working for the greater good. Minear noted that "I pitched it and I was going to do it, eventually, until we found ourselves at a point in the year where we needed a script really fast." Executive producer Frank Spotnitz suggested that the "convicted atheist" be replaced with Robert Modell from the third season episode "Pusher". Minear thus put aside the "Word of God" story (as it was called), and worked with Gilligan to write the final script.

Robert Wisden, who had played Modell in the original episode, was re-hired for this episode, and Diana Scarwid was chosen to play Modell's sister. The scenes taking place at the Lorton Penitentiary cafeteria were actually filmed at a former hospital storage facility. In order to dress the set, the structure had to be cleared of aged detritus and garbage; this required the destruction of several large sump pumps, which were "jackhammered into smithereens". The body of Nathan Bowman, Linda's husband, was created by drenching an in-house dummy with the correct shade of paint. The episode's title, "Kitsunegari" (狐狩り) is a Japanese term meaning "fox hunting". The series hired two Japanese translators to produce the proper Japanese translation of the phrase and its associated Kanji glyph, due to the fact that "fox hunting" is not a pre-existing term in the Japanese language.

Reception
"Kitsunegari" premiered on the Fox network in the United States on January 4, 1998. This episode earned a Nielsen rating of 11.6, with a 17 share, meaning that roughly 11.6 percent of all television-equipped households, and 17 percent of households watching television, were tuned in to the episode. It was viewed by 19.75 million viewers.

The episode received mixed reviews from television critics. Robert Shearman and Lars Pearson, in their book Wanting to Believe: A Critical Guide to The X-Files, Millennium & The Lone Gunmen, rated the episode three-and-a-half stars out of five. The two wrote that, while "it lacks Vince Gilligan's trademark wit", the episode takes the plot threads started in "Pusher" to their "logical conclusions". Shearman and Pearson explained that the episode's acting, most notably that of Robert Wisden and Diana Scarwid, "helps raise 'Kitsunegari' above the average." Zack Handlen from The A.V. Club gave the episode a mixed review and awarded it a C+. He wrote that, despite his love for "Pusher", "'Kitsunegari' isn't anywhere near as good as its predecessor". Handlen cited the change in Modell's personality, his lack of a desire to kill, and Scully's portrayal as a "humorless scold who only sees the truth when required to for narrative convenience" as reasons why the episode was weak. He concluded that "Kitsunegari" was "not very well put together".

Paula Vitaris from Cinefantastique gave the episode a mixed review and awarded it two stars out of four. She called the entry "tame" compared to its original, although she understood the show's desire to write a sequel. Vitaris also criticized the fact that Modell never murdered anyone and called the episode's basic plot "cheesy". She did, however, compliment several of the episode's set pieces, such as "Nathan Bowman covered in cerulean blue paint"—which she called "striking"—and the scene wherein "Linda stops the heart of the suffering Modell", calling the latter "sensately performed."

Critic A.J. Black compared the fate of Modell to that of writer Vince Gilligan's later characters, Walter White and Saul Goodman from Breaking Bad and Better Call Saul, noting: "“You won her game,” his boss Walter Skinner suggests of Linda’s plan. “Then how come I feel like I lost?” is all Mulder can say. Gilligan and Minear here evoke the same zero-sum sense of sadness riven throughout both Breaking Bad projects. Walt and Jimmy/Saul see themselves as crime lords and rule-breaking super lawyers respectively but by the end, they are left with a vacuum. What was it all for? Better Call Saul’s finale is not called ‘Saul Gone’ for nothing."

See also
 List of unmade episodes of The X-Files

Footnotes

Bibliography

External links 

 "Kitsunegari" on TheXFiles.com
 

1998 American television episodes
Fiction about mind control
Television episodes directed by Daniel Sackheim
Television episodes written by Vince Gilligan
Television episodes written by Tim Minear
Television episodes set in Virginia
The X-Files (season 5) episodes